The 1917–18 Austrian First Class season was the seventh season of top-tier football in Austria. It was won by Floridsdorfer AC who would finish ahead of SK Rapid Wien by goal difference.

League standings

Results

References
Austria - List of final tables (RSSSF)

Austrian Football Bundesliga seasons
Austria
1917–18 in Austrian football